Vivien Heilbron (born 13 May 1944) is a Scottish actress.

Career
Heilbron, who was born in Glasgow, was a member of the company at Dundee Repertory Theatre in the mid-1960s.  She achieved fame in her homeland when she appeared in the 1971 BBC Scotland television series Sunset Song, an adaptation of Lewis Grassic Gibbon's novel, in the lead role of Chris Guthrie. "The television programme was quite instrumental in raising Gibbon's publicity", she said. "It put him on the school curriculum where he had not been before."

In the early 1980s she appeared in its two sequels Cloud Howe and Grey Granite (the trilogy is known as A Scots Quair).

From the first episode in 1980, she played district nurse Kay Grant in the Scottish Television soap opera “Take The High Road”. 

In 1972 she starred in The Moonstone, a BBC adaptation of the Wilkie Collins novel. She appeared as Emm in Ace of Wands and as regular Det. Sgt. Louise Colbert in the BBC detective series Target. She received an Emmy nomination for her performance in The Moonstone. She appeared as a minor character, Christine Pretis, in EastEnders from 1989 to 1992.

Other television appearances include Lord Peter Wimsey (TV series), (The Unpleasantness at the Bellona Club, one episode); Hetty Wainthropp Investigates; Taggart; The New Statesman; and Poirot.

On stage she has played Elizabeth in Richard III opposite Derek Jacobi and Blanche DuBois in A Streetcar Named Desire at the Royal Lyceum Theatre in Edinburgh. She more recently returned in An Evening With Grassic Gibbon, playing The Narrator.

Personal life
Heilbron met actor Jonathan Cecil when they were both studying at the London Academy of Music and Dramatic Art, and the couple married in 1963. The couple divorced after Cecil met actress Anna Sharkey in 1972, with the two marrying in 1976.

Heilbron married actor David Rintoul in 2008. She is the elder sister of actress Lorna Heilbron and the sister-in-law of Nicholas Clay.

References

External links
 
 biography at The Shakespeare Institute
 Commissioned portrait of Vivien Heilbron

1944 births
Living people
Actresses from Glasgow
Scottish film actresses
Scottish television actresses
Scottish stage actresses
20th-century Scottish actresses
21st-century Scottish actresses
People educated at Westbourne School for Girls